Aafje Looijenga-Vos (29 April 1928 in Marum – 4 November 2018 in Amersfoort) was a Dutch crystallographer. She was a professor for general chemistry and later for structural chemistry at the University of Groningen.

Life 
She studied chemistry at the University of Groningen from 1946 to 1952. Already in 1948, she met other crystallographers during the first Congress of the International Union of Crystallography (IUCr). In 1952, she started her PhD in the group of the Eelco Wiebenga. Her PhD thesis dealt with the structures of P4S10 and P4S7 and was named "De kristalstructuur van P4S10 and P4S7 ". She defended the thesis in 1955. The first two years after defending her thesis, she worked at UK crystallographic institutions (Glasgow, Leeds, Oxford, and Cambridge), where she also worked with Dorothy Hodgkin. In 1962, she became a professor for general chemistry and, in 1967, she became a professor of structural chemistry at the University of Groningen. She was the secretary of the IUCr Commission on the International Tables and was involved in realising the 1983 edition of Volume A of the International Tables for Crystallography. In 1982, she married Hans Looijenga, a widower with eight children. She was survived by 21 grandchildren and 4 great-grandchildren.

Research 
Together with Philip Coppens, she performed neutron diffraction experiments on cyanuric acid crystals. She also worked on direct methods together with Isabella Karle. She was also involved in the development of the CAD-4, the Computer Automated Diffractometer with 4 circles. Furthermore, her research dealt with the following topics: cyclophosphazenes, electron-density distribution studies based on high-resolution data at low temperature, and relations between structure and both electrical and magnetic properties of morpholinium-TCNQ compounds.

Selected publications

Awards 
Since 1980, she was a member of the Royal Netherlands Academy of Arts and Sciences.

References 

1928 births
2018 deaths
University of Groningen alumni
People from Marum
Members of the Royal Netherlands Academy of Arts and Sciences
20th-century Dutch chemists
Dutch women chemists
Academic staff of the University of Groningen
20th-century Dutch women scientists